Aydınyayla can refer to:

 Aydınyayla, Alaplı
 Aydınyayla, Yığılca